Borgarvirki  lies between Vesturhóp  and Víðidalur  in the north of Iceland, and at 177m above sea level it dominates the surrounding region. Made out of basalt strata, it has been used as a fortress. Borgarvirki is a natural phenomenon, altered by humans in earlier centuries. In 1949, Borgarvirki was renovated by workers who installed a granite lintel at the main entrance.

Borgarvirki is a volcanic plug (gosstapi ), and the Icelandic sagas mention that in earlier centuries it was used for military purposes. There is a viewing dial inside.

It is accessible to visitors travelling around the peninsula of Vatnsnes.

See also 
 List of columnar basalts in Iceland

References

External links 

North Iceland
Landforms of Iceland
Mountains of Iceland
Volcanoes of Iceland
Volcanic plugs of Iceland
Columnar basalts in Iceland